Adicta is the Second studio album by Colombian pop-rock singer Naty Botero, released by EMI Music in Colombia

Track listing
Botero co-wrote and co-produced all of the songs on the album.

Musical videos
 "Esta Noche Es Nuestra"
 "Tu Amor Me Parte En Dos"
 "Niño Loco"
 "Adicta"
 "Knokeada"
 "Mucho Más"

Charts

References

2009 albums
Naty Botero albums